Jade Vansteenkiste (born 17 July 2003) is a Belgian artistic gymnast. She competed at the 2019 World Championships.

Personal life 
Jade Vansteenkiste was born on 17 July 2003, in Izegem. Her parents, Roy and Evelyn, are former triathlon competitors. Vansteenkiste speaks both Dutch and English. Her favorite events are vault and floor exercise.

Career 
Vansteenkiste competed at the 2018 European Junior Championships along with Stacy Bertrandt, Margaux Daveloose, Fien Enghels, and Noemie Louon, and they finished 6th.

Vansteenkiste became eligible for senior competition in 2019. She competed at the 2019 European Championships where she finished 20th in the all-around final with a score of 48.798, and she finished 6th in the floor exercise final with a score of 13.233. She competed at the 2019 World Championships along with Maellyse Brassart, Senna Deriks, Nina Derwael, and Margaux Daveloose. The team finished in 10th place and qualified for a team spot to the 2020 Olympic Games.

At the 2020 Gymnix International, she won a silver medal with the Belgian team and a bronze medal on the floor exercise behind MyKayla Skinner and Emily Lee. Vansteenkiste was selected for Belgium's Olympic pre-selection team of thirteen gymnasts, six of whom will be chosen for the 2020 Olympic team.

References

External links 
 
 

Belgian female artistic gymnasts
2003 births
Living people
People from Izegem
Sportspeople from West Flanders